Louise Armstrong (March 17, 1937 – August 10, 2008) was a published author of numerous adult and children books. A staunch feminist and activist, Armstrong had spoken widely for two decades in the United States, Canada, and England, on the subjects of child abuse, incest, family violence, and sexual abuse. Her book, Kiss Daddy Goodnight, published by Pocket Books in 1978, is a groundbreaking work on incest.

Armstrong was faculty of the Institute of Children's Literature and chaired a committee on family violence for the National Women's Health Network (1979–84). Armstrong also wrote for magazines, including Woman's Day and Connecticut Magazine, On the Issues.

Her son is Emmy Award-winning television producer and filmmaker Noah Hawley.

Published works

Adult books
Of 'Sluts' and 'Bastards': A Feminist Decodes the Child Welfare Debate (Common Courage Press, 1996)
Rocking the Cradle of Sexual Politics, What Happened When Women Said Incest (Addison-Wesley, 1994; The Women's Press, 1996)
And They Call It Help, The Psychiatric Policing of America's Children (Addison-Wesley, 1993)
Solomon Says, A Speakout on Foster Care (Pocket Books, 1989)
Kiss Daddy Goodnight: Ten Years Later (Pocket Books, 1987)
The Home Front, Notes from the Family War Zone (McGraw-Hill, 1983)
Kiss Daddy Goodnight, A Speakout on Incest (Pocket Books, 1978).
Saving the Big Deal Baby (E.P. Dutton, 1980)

Children's books
A Child's Guide to Freud, Illustrated, Whitney Darrow, Jr. (Simon & Schuster, 1963).
How to Turn Lemons Into Money, A Child's Guide to Economics (Harcourt Brace Jovanovich, 1975).
How to Turn Up into Down, A Child's Guide to Inflation, Depression, and Economic Recovery (HBJ, 1978).
How to Turn War into Peace, A Child's Guide to Conflict Resolution  (HBJ, 1979).
Arthur Gets What He Spills (HBJ, 1979)

Collected works
Contributed chapters in the following numerous collected works, both academic and trade.
Sexual Liberals and the Attack on Feminism (eds: Dorchen Leidholdt and Janice G. Raymond; Pergamon Press, 1990);
Radically Speaking, Feminism Reclaimed (eds: Diane Bell and Renate Klein; Zed Books, 1996);
Feminist Foremothers in Women's Studies, Psychology, Mental Health (eds: Phyllis Chesler, Esther D. Rothblum, Ellen Cole; Haworth Press, 1995);  and
Home Truths About Child Sexual Abuse: Influencing Policy and Practice (ed: Catherine Itzin; London: Routledge, 2000).

References

External links

1937 births
2008 deaths
American children's writers
American feminists
Place of birth missing
Place of death missing
American women children's writers
Writers from New York City
20th-century American writers
20th-century American women writers
21st-century American women